Oemleria cerasiformis, a shrub commonly known as osoberry or Indian plum, is the sole species in genus Oemleria.

Native to the Pacific coast and ranges of North America, from British Columbia, Canada to Santa Barbara County, California, U.S.A., it is among the first plants to leaf out and flowers early in the spring. It reaches a height of 1.5–5 m and has lance-shaped leaves 5–12 cm long.

The fruits of osoberry are edible and resemble small plums which are dark blue when ripe. Indigenous peoples of the Americas include osoberry in their diets, make tea of the bark, and chew its twigs to use as a mild anesthetic and aphrodisiac.

Description
Osoberry is an erect, loosely branched shrub reaching  in height. Leaves are alternate, simple, deciduous; generally elliptical or oblong, light green and smooth above and paler below with very small soft hairs; margins are entire to wavy; fresh foliage smells and may taste like cucumber. Among the first plants to leaf-out in the spring. The plants are dioecious; male and female flowers occur on different plants. The 5-petaled flowers are white or whitish-green, pendulous, about 1 cm across, and often appear in late winter before the leaves. The twig is slender, green turning to reddish brown, pith chambered, conspicuous orange lenticles. Bark is smooth, reddish brown to dark gray.

Indian Plum is "shrubby"—often with multiple trunks and horizontal growth. Sagging branches that touch the ground root readily and separate, so large trees are often surrounded by genetic clones.

Uses
The wood is exceptionally strong and fine grained.  With stems generally less than two inches [5 cm] in diameter, this small size limits the size of products that can be made from it.  The fairly common straight shoots make fine primitive arrows and the rare, large enough and straight stem can be fashioned into an excellent self bow.  It is also suitable for small wooden tools such as spoons, combs, knitting needles, etc.  The fine grain and lack of significant figure also make the wood well suited for fine detail carving.

The Pacific coast tribes utilized its fruit, twigs, and bark, as food sources and for teas and medicine. It is one of the first tree-borne fruits to ripen in summer and as such was prized by indigenous peoples and wildlife alike. Fruiting is highly variable, with sunny locations producing more, as well as larger and sweeter fruits. The fruits can be eaten raw, or cooked when bitter; they tend to be somewhat astringent.

Images

References

External links
 
 Jepson Manual Treatment
 Photo gallery

Exochordeae
Flora of the Northwestern United States
Flora of Oregon
Monotypic Rosaceae genera
Plants used in Native American cuisine
Dioecious plants
Flora without expected TNC conservation status